Chuck Sklar is an American comedian, film and television writer, and television producer. He is known for comedy writing on various shows, including The Chris Rock Show, The Man Show, and Weekends at the D.L. In 2012, Sklar and Chris Rock produced a pilot featuring San Francisco comedian, W. Kamau Bell, launching the FX television network show Totally Biased with W. Kamau Bell. Chuck Sklar was the lead role in Louis C.K.'s Tomorrow Night as Charles, a misanthropic photoshop owner. He also appeared in the 1997 independent comedy movie Who's the Caboose? starring Sarah Silverman.

Sklar is a poker enthusiast, winning over $150,000 in a 2010 Legends of Poker Tournament.

References 

American comedy writers
Living people
American television writers
American male television writers
Primetime Emmy Award winners
American poker players
American television producers
American male comedians
21st-century American comedians
Year of birth missing (living people)
21st-century American screenwriters
21st-century American male writers